Alexandros Mouzas (born 1962) is a Greek composer. He studied composition with Theodore Antoniou, advanced theory with Haris Xanthoudakis and electronic music with Dimitris Kamarotos.

He has composed for various ensembles and has received commissions from organizations and orchestras.
He has collaborated with the choreographer Konstantinos Michos and the Lathos Kinissi dance group in many productions, among them Trisha Never Left Home, Days of Vironas, Papageno and Calamity till the Dawn and with Airesis Dance Company.

His professional activities include image-related music. He has written original music for short films, television series, documentaries and commercials for most of the Greek television channels.
He was the artistic director of the Greek Section of the European programme New Media Edge Project (2003).

In 2004, he composed under commission by the Athens 2004 Organizing Committee, original music for the Athens Olympic Games corporate videos.

His recent professional activities include production management of various important CD releases of Greek orchestral music. 
He is the manager and founding member of the Ergon Ensemble.

He runs his own production company, Anax – Cultural Projects. 
He teaches music technology and film music at top schools in Athens.

Since 1998, he has been a member of the Board of Directors of the Greek Composers’ Union.

NAXOS music label released the CD with orchestral works titled Music for an imaginary film, performed by the Sofia Philharmonic Orchestra.

Commissions
Megaron, the Athens Concert Hall: film scores for Tusalava (2012) by Len Lye and Film (2012) by Alan Schneider, Asma Asmaton (2008), Struwwelpeter (2004), Trisha Never Left Home (1999) 
The Athens Camerata (the Friends of Music Orchestra): Cam-Media (2009)
Orchestra of Colors: Stones of Destiny (2010), Giant with the Red Boots (2010), Trisevgeni (2008)
Alea III, Boston: Monologue (2001)
Greek National Radio: Prima Materia (1996)

Works

Orchestra  
InnerScape (2006) for symphony orchestra
Lucid Dream (2004) for string orchestra
Thought Forms (2002) for string orchestra
Monologue (2001/2005) concerto for english horn and orchestra
Music for an Imaginary Film (1998/2004) for chamber orchestra
Prima Materia (1996/2005) for orchestra
Shadows Over the City, (1995) suite for chamber orchestra

Chamber music
Handshake Νο III (2009) for marimba and vibraphone
Handshake Νο ΙΙ (2006) for oboe and clarinet
On Time (2006) for flute, clarinet, cello, percussion and piano
Handshake Νο Ι (2002) for flute duet
Quintet (1997) for woodwinds
Six Miniatures (1996) string quartet

Stage  
Stones of Destiny (2010) on text by L. Gaude for actor/narrator, 3 female voices & laptop.
Trisevgeni (2007) a musical tale for actor/narrator, laptop, synthesizer, flute, clarinet & percussion.
Struwwelpeter (2004) (text by H.Hoffman, translation by Jenny Mastoraki), for actor/narrator, string orchestra, two clarinets and perc.

Multimedia
Cam-Media (2009) for string orchestra, computer and live performance of 25 students using various objects.
Asma Asmaton (2008) a multimedia production for mezzo-soprano, chamber ensemble, laptop, video and dance. Text from Asma Asmaton (Song of Solomon)

Dance
Calamity Till the Dawn (2002)
Papageno, (2000) digital re-construction of Magic Flute opera
Trisha Never Left Home, (1999) for orchestra and voices
Stories of Vironas (1998)

Vocal
To Anafilito tis Alithias, (2011) for mezzo soprano and small ensemble
Animus Errat, (T. Tzara, A. Breton & F. Schouppe)1994) for tenor, horn and piano

Solo
Inner Lines (2006) for solo flute
Ad Lumina, (2002) for solo flute

Chorus
Water Music, on text by Ryōkan Taigu (2011) for small ensemble and mixed chorus
Voices, text by Κ. Cavafy, (1997) for chorus

Film
Law of Gravity (Sp.Rasidakis, director) (2001-2002)

Television
Tyhero mou asteri (1988, ET2)
Epikindini Alitheia (1989, ET2)
Aksiotimoi Kyrioi (1989, ET1)
Diki- The Trial (1991, ET2)
Isovitis (1992–93, ET1)
Episkeptis tis omihlis (1992, MEGA)
Tris Somatofylakes (1993, ET1)
Eftyhos dysaresta nea (1994, ET1)
Skies pano apo tin poli (1994)
Hara and Gundun (1997, ET1)
Kai oi pantremenoi ehoun psyhi (1997-2000, ANT1)
Gia mia thesi ston Helio (1999-2002, MEGA)
Apagorevmeni Agapi (1998-2001, MEGA)
Lefkos Ikos (2003, ANT1)
Erotas me epidotisi OGA (2005, Alpha)

Miscellaneous
Music for adv and corporate videos for various companies: Athens Airport, Iaso, Attiki Bank, Skip, Giotis, Kraft, Pampers etc.
Original music for the Athens Olympic Games corporate videos

References

External links
Official site
Greek Composer's Union
Ergon Ensemble

1962 births
Greek classical composers
Living people
Male classical composers